The InterPlane Griffon is a single seat, high wing, single engine, pusher configuration, tricycle gear ultralight aircraft, that was produced in kit form from InterPlane Aircraft of Zbraslavice, Czech Republic.

Development
The Griffon was the first design produced by InterPlane when they opened for business in 1992. The Griffon was designed for the requirements of the US FAR 103 Ultralight Vehicles category, including that category's maximum  empty weight.

The Griffon airframe is constructed from aluminum tubing, with the wings and tail covered with doped aircraft fabric. The wing is supported by a "V" strut and utilizes jury struts. It features a three tube tail that allows the pusher propeller to be located in between the tail booms. Standard features supplied included brakes, electric starting, wheel pants, elevator trim system and a plastic cockpit pod fairing with a windshield. The wings and tail surfaces can be folded for trailering or storage.

Available engines included the  Rotax 447 and the  Rotax 503.

Variants
Griffon
Basic version equipped with  Rotax 447, empty weight .
Griffon EX
Deluxe version equipped with  Rotax 503, empty weight .

Specifications (Griffon EX)

See also

References

Griffon
1990s Czech and Czechoslovakian ultralight aircraft
Single-engined pusher aircraft